The French Committee of National Liberation was a provisional government of Free France formed by the French generals Henri Giraud and Charles de Gaulle to provide united leadership, organize and coordinate the campaign to liberate France from Nazi Germany during World War II. The committee was formed on 3 June 1943 and after a period of joint leadership, on 9 November it came under the chairmanship of de Gaulle. The committee directly challenged the legitimacy of the Vichy regime and unified all the French forces that fought against the Nazis and collaborators. The committee functioned as a provisional government for Algeria (then a part of metropolitan France) and the liberated parts of the colonial empire. Later it evolved into the Provisional Government of the French Republic, under the premiership of Charles de Gaulle.

Background

After the occupation of France in 1940, the Vichy regime was set up under Marshal Philippe Pétain to govern much of southern and central France. The Vichy regime distanced itself from the Allied Powers and signed an armistice with Nazi Germany and another one with Fascist Italy. French resistance was split and disorganized, with the Free French forces established under Gen. Charles de Gaulle in Britain while other French Army units remained under the leadership of Gen. Henri Giraud in France's colonial possessions in North Africa. Both factions struggled to gain legitimacy and representation amongst the Allied Powers. Following the Allied invasion of North Africa in 1942, de Gaulle  to Algiers in French Algeria, where he linked up with Giraud's forces. Although Giraud had  supported the Vichy regime, he joined de Gaulle in creating a united front and command of all French forces in North Africa, Europe, and in the colonial possessions in Asia.

When the Allies arrived in November 1942, North Africa supported Vichy.  François Darlan, formerly Prime Minister under Petain, was now Admiral and head of French military forces in North Africa, because the Allies viewed him as someone who could ease the transition from Vichy to Allied support.  Following his assassination in December 1942, Darlan was replaced by General Henri Giraud, who was appointed French Civil and Military Commander-in-chief in North Africa, an appointment that De Gaulle strongly opposed, calling for a purge of Vichy collaborators. From March 1943, Giraud started to become more critical of Vichy (notably in a speech written by advisor Jean Monnet). By June, the different branches of Free France, led by de Gaulle out of London and Giraud out of Algeria, merged into one, creating the unified French Committee of National Liberation.

Formation

The Committee was formed on 3 June 1943 in Algiers, the capital of French Algeria Giraud and de Gaulle served jointly as co-presidents of the committee. The charter of the body affirmed its commitment to "re-establish all French liberties, the laws of the Republic and the Republican regime." The committee saw itself as a source of unity and representation for the French nation. The Vichy regime was decried as illegitimate over its collaboration with Nazi Germany. The Committee received mixed responses from the Allies; the U.S. and Britain considered it a war-time body with restricted functions, being different from a future government of liberated France. The Committee soon expanded its membership, developed a distinctive administrative body and incorporated as the Provisional Consultative Assembly, creating an organized, representative government within itself. With Allied recognition, the Committee and its leaders, Gens. Giraud and de Gaulle enjoyed considerable popular support within France and the French resistance, thus becoming the forerunners in the process to form a provisional government for France as liberation approached. However, Charles de Gaulle politically outmaneuvered Gen. Giraud, and asserted complete control and leadership over the Committee.

Provisional government

With the Allied invasion of Normandy, the Committee moved its headquarters to London, and in August 1944 the Committee moved to Paris, following the liberation of France by Allied forces. In September, Allied forces recognized the Committee as the legitimate, provisional government of France, whereupon the Committee reorganized itself under the presidency of Charles de Gaulle, incorporating representatives of various French political parties such as the Socialists and French Communists. The Committee also began the process of writing a new constitution to found the French Fourth Republic. However, Charles de Gaulle resigned in 1946 over the provisional legislature's refusal to grant more powers to the President and owing to the in-fighting between various political factions and the Communists.

See also
Free France

References

Politics of World War II
France in World War II
1943 establishments in France
Free French Forces
Governments in exile during World War II
1943 establishments in Algeria
Charles de Gaulle